Amorphae is a jazz studio album by Ben Monder with Pete Rende, Andrew Cyrille and Paul Motian. This album was released in the label ECM Records in January 2016.

Composition
Amorphae was originally planned to be a series of duets between Ben Monder and Paul Motian. They started recording a duo session in 2010, but Motian died a year after. Monder wanted to continue the project and then, Andrew Cyrille and Paul Rende joined him.

Reception
In The Guardian, John Fordham gave this album three stars and says that "Playing unaccompanied on conventional and baritone guitars, Monder embraces soft tone poems of humming sustains and eerie echoes, as well as wilder David Torn-like tumults." and add that "His soundworld is a shade private and austere, but ECM’s blessing should alert a wider audience to Monder’s talents."

Thomas Conrad of Jazz Times stated "The album sustains a single ethereal domain of sonorities, even though it was recorded in two sessions three years apart and uses four different combinations of players... It is remarkable how many layers of sound Monder can produce from one guitar and one vintage Lexicon reverb unit. Cyrille offers, selectively, brushstrokes of color. On two trio pieces with Cyrille and Pete Rende on synth, the sonic landscape becomes vast but the creative process remains profoundly gradual. In one respect only, Amorphae is typical of current jazz releases: The ratio of originals to standards is 7-to-1. “Oh, What a Beautiful Morning” is a duet with Paul Motian, in one of his final recordings. Motian's signature deft irregular accents create dramatic expectancy for the initial tentative forays of Monder, who grasps for fragments of the melody. Then Monder and his Lexicon blow this sweet song of Rodgers and Hammerstein into a wild, keening, howling storm. With more tracks like this one, Amorphae would have been a stronger and even stranger album."

Track listing
ECM Records – ECM 2421.

Personnel
Ben Monder – electric guitar, electric baritone guitar
Pete Rende – synthesizer
Andrew Cyrille – drums
Paul Motian – drums

References

ECM Records albums
2016 albums
Albums produced by Manfred Eicher